Stara Vas is a small village on the southern outskirts of Postojna in the Inner Carniola region of Slovenia.

Church

The local church in the settlement is dedicated to Saint Anthony of Padua and belongs to the Parish of Postojna.

References

External links

Stara Vas on Geopedia

Populated places in the Municipality of Postojna